Piper nebuligaudens is a species of plant in the family Piperaceae. It is endemic to Ecuador.

References

Flora of Ecuador
nebuligaudens
Vulnerable plants
Taxonomy articles created by Polbot